Now Autumn 2007 is a compilation CD released by EMI Music Australia in 2007. It is the 16th CD in the Australian Now! series.

Track listing
Fedde le Grand – "Put Your Hands Up 4 Detroit" (2:24)
Robbie Williams – "Lovelight" (3:58)
Sneaky Sound System – "Pictures" (3:17)
Eric Prydz vs. Floyd – "Proper Education" (3:18)
Fonzerelli – "Moonlight Party" (Aaron McClelland Summer Mix) (2:53)
Eskimo Joe – "New York" (3:48)
Jamelia – "Something About You" (3:20)
Evermore – "Unbreakable" (3:09)
Panic! at the Disco – "Lying Is the Most Fun a Girl Can Have Without Taking Her Clothes Off" (2:59)
Stacie Orrico – "So Simple" (3:47)
Cassie – "Long Way 2 Go" (3:41)
David Guetta vs. The Egg – "Love Don't Let Me Go (Walking Away)" (Joachim Garraud Radio Edit) (3:14)
Bodyrox featuring Luciana – "Yeah Yeah" (D. Ramirez Radio Edit) (2:38)
KT Tunstall – "Suddenly I See" (3:11)
John Butler Trio – "Funky Tonight" (3:40)
All Saints – "Rock Steady" (2:45)
Gnarls Barkley – "Gone Daddy Gone" (2:29)
Basement Jaxx – "Take Me Back to Your House" (3:43)
Andy J – "I Will Have You" (2:47)
Jet – "Rip It Up" (3:19)
Little Birdy – "Bodies" (3:39)
Something with Numbers – "Chase the Chaser" (3:04)

External links
 NOW Autumn 2007 @ Australian Charts

2007 compilation albums
EMI Records compilation albums
Now That's What I Call Music! albums (Australian series)